The 1995 IIHF Women's Pacific Rim Championship was an international ice hockey tournament held between April 3 and 8, 1995 in San Jose, California, United States.

Canada won the tournament despite losing in the group stage 5-2 to the United States. They defeated China in a shootout before taking the US to a shootout as well to win the championship.

Teams and format
Four teams completed in this inaugural tournament. The teams were:

The teams first played a full round robin against each other. After these three games, all teams proceeded to the semi-final (1st vs 4th and 2nd vs 3rd) with the winning teams meeting in the final.

First round

Standings

Results

Playoff round

Final round

Semi-finals

Match for third place

Final

Champions

Final standings

See also
 1996 Women's Pacific Rim Championship

External links
 1995 Pacific Rim Tournament

1994–95 in women's ice hockey
1995
IIHF Women's Pacific Rim Championship
Pac
April 1995 sports events in the United States
1995 in sports in California
20th century in San Jose, California
Ice hockey competitions in California
Sports competitions in San Jose, California
Women's ice hockey competitions in the United States
Women's sports in California